'Dutch–Portuguese relations' are diplomatic, economic, military and cultural relations between the Kingdom of the Netherlands and the Portuguese Republic. Both countries are member states of NATO and the European Union. The Netherlands has its embassy to Portugal in Lisbon, while Portuguese has its embassy to the Netherlands in The Hague. Relations between the two countries date back as early as the 17th century, when the Kingdom of Portugal sent its first ambassador, Tristão de Mendonça Furtado, to the United Provinces of the Netherlands in 1641.  In modern times, relations between the Netherlands and Portugal are warm and strong.